Alan Plantagenet Stewart, 10th Earl of Galloway, KT, DL, JP (21 October 1835 – 7 February 1901), styled Lord Garlies until 1873, was a British peer and politician.

Background
Galloway was the eldest son of Randolph Stewart, 9th Earl of Galloway, and Lady Harriett Blanche, daughter of Henry Somerset, 6th Duke of Beaufort. He was educated at Harrow School.

Cricket
He played first-class cricket for the Marylebone Cricket Club between 1858 and 1864.

Public life
Galloway sat as Member of Parliament for Wigtownshire between 1868 and 1873. The latter year he succeeded to his father's earldom and estates, including the family seats of Galloway House and Cumloden House, and entered the House of Lords.

He was also Lord High Commissioner to the General Assembly of the Church of Scotland from 1876 to 1877 and a justice of the peace and deputy lieutenant for Kirkcudbrightshire and Wigtownshire. In 1887 he was appointed a Knight of the Thistle.

Personal life
Lord Galloway married Lady Arabella Arthur, daughter of James Gascoyne-Cecil, 2nd Marquess of Salisbury, in 1872 (he was consequently the brother-in-law of Prime Minister Robert Gascoyne-Cecil, 3rd Marquess of Salisbury). Their daughter, Helen Stewart, married Neo-Jacobite Walter Clifford Mellor. Lord Galloway died in February 1901, aged 65, and was succeeded in the earldom by his younger brother, Randolph. Lady Galloway died in August 1903.

On 14 October 1889, The Earl of Galloway appeared in Dumfries Sheriff Court on a charge of indecent behaviour towards a young girl. He was found 'not guilty'.

On 23 January 1890, the Earl of Galloway appeared again in court, Glasgow Central Police Court, charged with having been 'riotous, disorderly or indecent' in his behaviour, by accosting, following and molesting Margaret Brown and one or more female passengers. The charge was found 'not proven'.

Ancestry

References

External links

1835 births
1901 deaths
People educated at Harrow School
10
Lords High Commissioner to the General Assembly of the Church of Scotland
Members of the Parliament of the United Kingdom for Scottish constituencies
UK MPs 1868–1874
Galloway, E10
Knights of the Thistle
Politics of Dumfries and Galloway
19th-century Scottish politicians
Scottish cricketers
Marylebone Cricket Club cricketers
Presidents of the Marylebone Cricket Club
Gentlemen of England cricketers
Gentlemen of Marylebone Cricket Club cricketers